Sir Henry Paulet St John-Mildmay, 3rd Baronet (30 September 1764 – 11 November 1808), of Dogmersfield Park, Hampshire, was an English politician.

Life
St John was the only son of Sir Henry Paulet St John, Bt and his wife Dorothea Maria Tucker, daughter of Abraham Tucker of Betchworth Castle, Surrey, and was born on 30 September 1764. He matriculated at St John's College, Cambridge in 1781, graduating M.A. in 1785.

St John succeeded to the baronetcy and Dogmersfield Park in 1784. He was a Member (MP) for Westbury 1796 – 1802, for Winchester 1802–1807 and for Hampshire 1807 – 11 November 1808.

In 1790 St John succeeded his wife's great-uncle Carew Hervey Mildmay to Marks Hall, Essex and Hazelgrove, Somerset and took additional name of Mildmay. In 1796 he also succeeded his wife's aunt Anne, widow of Sir William Mildmay, 1st Bt., to Moulsham Hall, Essex.

St John-Mildmay died in 1808 and was succeeded by his eldest son Sir Henry St John-Mildmay, 4th Baronet.

Family
St John married, in 1786, Jane, the daughter and coheir of Carew Mildmay of Shawford House, Hampshire and had 11 sons and 3 daughters.

Sir Henry St. John Carew (15 Apr 1787-17 Jan 1848)
Jane Dorothea (11 Apr 1788-15 Mar 1846); Paul Methuen, 1st Baron Methuen. They had four children.
Judith Anne (2 Apr 1790, d. 27 Apr 1851); married William Pleydell-Bouverie, 3rd Earl of Radnor. They had five children.
Maria (2 Apr 1790-21 Dec 1836); married Henry St John, 4th Viscount Bolingbroke. They had six children.
Paulet (8 Apr 1791-19 May 1845); married Anna Maria Wyndham Bouverie, daughter of the Hon. Bartholomew Bouverie MP. They had four children.
Capt. George William (20 Apr 1792-14 Feb 1851); married Mary Baillie, daughter of Peter Baillie MP for Inverness Burghs. They had a son, and daughter.
Humphrey (11 Jul 1794-9 Aug 1853); married first the Hon. Anne Eugenia Baring, daughter of Alexander Baring, 1st Baron Ashburton. After her death he married  Marianne Frances Harcourt-Vernon, daughter of Granville Harcourt-Vernon MP. He had two sons with Anne, and three daughters with Marianne.
Capt. John Francis (8 Dec 1795-1 Sep 1823); unmarried. 
 Capt. Edward (7 Jul 1797-16 May 1868); married first Marianne Catherine Sherson, and together had four children. They divorced in 1830, and five years later he married Frances Lucy Penelope Percival. They had one daughter.
Rev. Walter (12 Oct 1798-31 Jul 1835); married Kitty Anne Warde. No known issue.
Ven. Carew Antony (2 Feb 1800-13 Jul 1878); married the Hon. Caroline Waldegrave, daughter of Adm. William Waldegrave, 1st Baron Radstock. They had two daughters.

References

1764 births
1808 deaths
Baronets in the Baronetage of Great Britain
People from Hart District
British MPs 1796–1800
UK MPs 1801–1802
UK MPs 1802–1806
UK MPs 1806–1807
UK MPs 1807–1812
Members of the Parliament of Great Britain for English constituencies
Members of the Parliament of the United Kingdom for English constituencies